The Kushner-Locke Company was an American independent motion picture/television production founded on March 12, 1983 by Donald Kushner and Peter Locke.

It is known for films such as The Adventures of Pinocchio, Liberace: Behind the Music, Basil, But I'm a Cheerleader, Freeway, Nutcracker: The Motion Picture and Teen Wolf. Kushner-Locke also produced animated films such as The Brave Little Toaster, The Brave Little Toaster Goes to Mars, The Brave Little Toaster to the Rescue, Rover Dangerfield, Dorothy Meets Ozma of Oz and Pound Puppies and the Legend of Big Paw.

History
In 1983, the company was established by Donald Kushner and Peter Locke, the former of which was a producer on the movie Tron, and the latter was a sales agent, and member of the Channing/Debin/Locke Company (which he co-founded with Stockard Channing and David Debin). In January 1987, it sold a minority interest to Atlantic Entertainment Group thus renaming it Atlantic/Kushner-Locke. That year, in 1987, it attempted to merge with television syndicator All American Television to form a single company that paid $36 million in a single transaction in order to establish it as a public company without an effort of an underwriting of an initial public offering, but the merger talks between Atlantic/Kushner-Locke and All American Television was never realized. Atlantic sold back its share in July 1988 and the company reverted to its original name.

In 1992, the company attempted a merger with Rysher Entertainment, but the deal's plans collapsed when neither company could come to an accord over who gets control of the combined company. On December 14, 1992, Patricia Clifford, who had just left Interscope Communications launched a Kushner-Locke affiliated production company, which its intent was to produce telemovies.

On April 29, 1997, Pascal Borno was named head of Kushner-Locke International. On March 12, 1998, Kushner/Locke International scored picture-pact deals with various picture companies, mostly television networks around the world.

In 2001, Kushner-Locke filed for Chapter 11 bankruptcy, and has operated under this stature since then. In November of that same year, Artisan Entertainment (now owned by Lionsgate) acquired the North American sales rights to its more than 300 titles. In 2013, the Kushner-Locke library was acquired by Multicom Entertainment from Lionsgate.

References

External links
 

 
1983 establishments in California
American companies established in 1983
American companies disestablished in 2002
Mass media companies established in 1983
Mass media companies disestablished in 2002
Film production companies of the United States
Companies that filed for Chapter 11 bankruptcy in 2001
Century City, Los Angeles
Companies based in Los Angeles
American independent film studios
2002 disestablishments in California